The Movement for Diversity (LMD) is a right-wing political party in New Caledonia, strongly supportive of the French status of the region; it is close to the French Union for a Popular Movement.

History

Jacques Lafleur, the former leader of the major loyalist Rally for Caledonia in the Republic (RPCR) left the RPCR in 2006 to found the Rally for Caledonia (RPC). The island's sole Senator, the anti-independence Kanak Simon Loueckhote joined the RPC in 2006, but in 2008, he left the party following a series of electoral defeats to form the Movement for Diversity, the LMD.

Loueckhote is strongly opposed to New Caledonia's independence from France. Loueckhote is a Kanak.

In the 2009 election, the LMD allied with the centrist Future Together list in the South Province, which won 16.33% in the province and two members of the LMD were elected, including Loueckhote. As a result, Loueckhote was eligible to sit in the Congress of New Caledonia. In the Loyalty Islands Province, the LMD ran independently and won only 3.6%, below the 5% threshold for seats.

Political parties in New Caledonia